The Coronado 15 is an American sailing dinghy that was designed by Frank V. Butler as a one-design racer and first built in 1968.

Production
The design was built by Catalina Yachts in the United States starting in 1968. The company built 3,800 examples of the design, but it is now out of production.

Design
The Coronado 15 is a recreational planing sailboat, built predominantly of fiberglass. It has a fractional sloop rig with black anodized aluminum spars. The mast is flexible and supported by stainless steel standing rigging. The hull has a spooned plumb stem, a vertical transom, a transom-hung rudder controlled by a tiller and a retractable centerboard. It displaces . The boat is self-draining and has flotation added, making it unsinkable.

For sailing the design is equipped with hiking straps, a trapeze, an outhaul, boom vang, a high-mounted boom and a mainsheet traveler. It has a storage compartment under the foredeck, equipped with a hatch for access. A binnacle with a compass was a factory option, as was a "kick-up" rudder design and sail windows in the mainsail and jib.

The design has a Portsmouth Yardstick racing average handicap of 91.7 and is normally raced by a crew of two sailors.

See also
List of sailing boat types

References

Dinghies
1960s sailboat type designs
Two-person sailboats
Sailboat types built by Catalina Yachts
Sailboat type designs by Frank Butler